Benjamin Cas Haley (born 1980; Paris, Texas) is an American singer-songwriter, who specialises in reggae-inflected music when singing. He rose to national prominence by appearing on America's Got Talent in 2007, finishing as runner-up on that season's competition, whereupon he has conducted several tours and produced several albums during his career with a number of different recording labels.

Career
Benjamin began his career developing pieces inspired by reggae music. In 2007, he auditioned for the second season of America's Got Talent, conducting several songs with his reggae-inflected music; his first for his audition earned praise from Piers Morgan, a judge for the program at the time, who praised his version of "Walking on the Moon" as being far better than when it had been sung by the musician Sting. His performances earned him national recognition, leading to him finishing the competition as runner-up. After his involvement on the program, he released a self-titled debut album later in the year, reaching No. 8 on Billboard'''s Reggae Albums chart.

In June 2010, Benjamin toured Hawaii with Josh Heinrichs playing shows in Hawaii, in which he made appearances on several local radio programs and the television morning news portion of Hawaii News Now. Three months later, he signed a deal with Easy Star Records, who released his follow-up album, Connection, on September 14. It reached No. 2 on Billboard's Reggae Albums chart in 2010. In October, he toured the U.S. west coast and Europe in support of Connection with the Easy Star All-Stars.

Benjamin released his third album, La Si Dah, on May 28, 2013, which consisted of thirteen songs, funded by his fans, and produced by both Benjamin and Grammy-winning producer-engineer Rob Fraboni. The release was followed by a European tour. Later that same year, Cas was nominated as best reggae rock entertainer for the 32nd annual International Reggae and World Music Awards.

In 2014, Haley suffered a skiing accident that left serious muscle and nerve damage in his neck. He endured eight months of acupuncture and vocal and physical therapy to get his voice back. The following year, on November 6, he released the album More Music More Family on Jimmy Buffett's Mailboat Records. Nine of its 12 songs were recorded in Hawaii, and three were recorded in Haley's home in Texas and filmed as part of a video series for the Dallas News.

On June 21, 2019, Haley released Lessons and Blessings, which was written during the time of his wife's illness. It was recorded at the Haley family farm, and his wife contributed to the songwriting.

In 2020, Cas Haley was the grand prize winner of the Lincoln Motor Company's "Chart Your Course" contest. His winning song, "Every Road I'm On," beat out over 1,600 entrants. Haley won a talent contract and a recording session at Capitol Studios, a Lincoln Corsair, and appeared in a national Lincoln marketing campaign. As part of the promotion, Haley met and worked with actor Matthew McConaughey, and musicians Jon Cleary, Tank of Tank and the Bangas, Ruthie Foster, and more. Lincoln filmed his cross-country journey, which ended at Capitol Studios in Hollywood, where he recorded the song. The campaign includes a national broadcast and online spot and a 24-minute documentary.

"Every Road I'm On" will be included on Cas Haley's album, All the Right People'', set for release in early 2021 on Jimmy Buffet's label, Mailboat Records.

Personal life
Benjamin was born in Paris, Texas on December 27, 1980, and is currently married to his wife, Cas Haley. The couple have two children - a son, Eben, and a daughter, Nolah. In 2018, Cas's wife, Cassy, was diagnosed with an aggressive form of breast cancer. Subsequently, Haley cancelled his tour dates and set up a GoFundMe campaign to help cover the family's medical expenses.

Discography

Albums

Singles

References

External links

Woodbelly's Official Site
Official America's Got Talent bio, including links to several of his performances

1980 births
21st-century American singers
Living people
America's Got Talent contestants
American rock guitarists
American male guitarists
People from Arlington, Texas
Singers from Texas
American reggae musicians
People from Paris, Texas
Easy Star Records artists
21st-century American guitarists
Guitarists from Texas
21st-century American male singers
Songwriters from Texas
American male songwriters